The Union of Salaried Employees (TU) was a trade union in Finland. With 125,000 members, TU was a major trade union for workers in industry and industrial services, technics, economy and information.

The union was established in 2001, when the Union of Technical Employees merged with the Finnish Industrial and Clerical Employees' Union, the Construction and Engineering Union, and the Swedish Union of Technicians and Foremen.  Like all its predecessors, it affiliated to the Finnish Confederation of Salaried Employees (STTK).  On formation, the union had 130,000 members, making it STTK's largest affiliate, and the fourth-largest union in Finland.

In 2011, the union merged with the Trade Union Direct, to form Trade Union Pro.

Presidents
2001: Ilkka Joenpalo
2005: Antti Rinne

External links
www.toimihenkilounioni.fi
ICT white-collar strike imminent in Finland? (12 Oct 2007)

References

Finnish Confederation of Professionals
Trade unions in Finland
Trade unions established in 2001
Trade unions disestablished in 2011